Ivesia rhypara is a species of flowering plant in the rose family known by the common name grimy mousetail, or grimy ivesia. It is native to Oregon and Nevada in the United States.

This perennial herb grows from woody roots and a branching caudex. It has hairy, overlapping, compound basal leaves and stems up to 15 centimeters long. At the ends of the stems are clustered white or pale yellow flowers. Blooming occurs in May through October.

There are two varieties of this plant. The var. rhypara grows on barren tuff and var. shellyi grows in rock cracks and crevices on pumice and tuff. When the plants grow in rock fissures they sometimes appear to be lined up in rows. Associated plants include Purshia tridentata, Poa sandbergii, Gilia congesta, Sitanion hystrix, Scutellaria nana, and Eriophyllum lanatum.

Threats to this species, particularly var. rhypara, include gold mining, as the habitat contains gold deposits. Other threats include cattle, off-road vehicles, fire suppression, and loss of pollinating insects.

The plant gets the name rhypara ("grimy" in Greek) both from its dusty appearance and from its discoverer, James W. Grimes.

References

rhypara
Flora of Nevada
Flora of Oregon
Plants described in 1977